Castigliano is a surname. Notable persons with that name include:

 Carlo Alberto Castigliano (1847–1884), Italian mathematician and physicist
 Caroline Castigliano (born c.1960), British fashion designer
 Eusebio Castigliano (1921–1949), Italian  football player

See also
 Castigliano's method
 Castiglione (surname)

Italian-language surnames